is a residential district located in the northeastern portion of Meguro, Tokyo, consisting of 1-chōme and 2-chōme. As of January 1, 2008, it has a total population of 8,843.

Nakachō borders Gohongi and Yūtenji on the north, Nakameguro on the northeast, Meguro on the east, Shimomeguro on the south, and Chūōchō on the west.

Education
Meguro City Board of Education operates public elementary and junior high schools.

Nakacho 1-chome and a portion of 2-chome are zoned to Aburamen Elementary School (油面小学校). Another part of 2-chome is zoned to Gohongi Elementary School (五本木小学校). Nakacho 1-chome is zoned to Otori Junior High School (大鳥中学校) while 2-chome is zoned to Meguro Central Junior High School (目黒中央中学校).

References

Districts of Meguro